Chengbei Subdistrict is a subdistrict in the heart of Linxia City, Gansu, People's Republic of China. , it has six residential communities under its administration.

See also
List of township-level divisions of Gansu

References

Township-level divisions of Gansu